Bryan Hickman (January 3, 1981 – January 3, 2012) was an American football linebacker. He played collegiately at Kansas State and had a brief professional career before suffering a career ending knee injury.

High school 
Hickman attended North Mesquite High School in Mesquite, Texas and was teammates with another Kansas State linebacker, Josh Buhl.

College career
At Kansas State, Hickman teamed up with fellow Texas high school linebackers, Terry Pierce and Josh Buhl to make a formidable linebacking crew for the Wildcats. In a home game against Iowa State in 2002, he recorded double-digit tackles, a tackle for loss, an interception and a forced fumble. Hickman finished his career at Kansas State as part of the conference championship team beating #1 Oklahoma and a berth in the Fiesta Bowl and second team All-Big 12. Hickman totaled four interceptions. He graduated with a degree in business.

Professional career
Bryan was with the NFL's Cleveland Browns when a knee injury ended his career.

Death
He died via suicide in January 2012.

References

1981 births
2012 deaths
2012 suicides
Players of American football from Texas
People from Mesquite, Texas
American football linebackers
Kansas State Wildcats football players
Suicides in the United States